Serhiy Yuriyovych Melashenko (born 10 August 1996) is a Ukrainian professional footballer who plays as a goalkeeper for lithuanian FK Transivest.

Career
Makhnovskyi began his career with Yunist Chernihiv. The sports school is known for its talent players like Andriy Yarmolenko, Nika Sichinava. Melashenko, played also in LKT Chernihiv and in Chernihiv kulikovka.

Desna Chernihiv
In 2016 he moved to Desna Chernihiv the main club in the city of Chernihiv in Ukrainian First League. With the team he was promoted in Ukrainian Premier League.

Mynai
On 27 August 2018 he moved to Mynai, where he played 11 matches in the season.

Hirnyk Kryvyi Rih
In 2019, he moved to Hirnyk Kryvyi Rih in Ukrainian Second League where in the season 2018–19 he got third place.

Nevėžis
In 2021 he moved to Nevėžis, based in the city of Kėdainiai in Lithuania and playing in A Lyga. In 2021, he made 17 appearances with the club in A Lyga.

Riteriai
In February 2022 he signed with Lithuanian FK Riteriai.

Personal life
His father Yuriy Melashenko was a coach of Yunist Chernihiv and a football goalkeeper of Desna Chernihiv.

Honours
Nevėžis
 I Lyga: 2020

Mynai
 Ukrainian Second League: 2018–19

Desna Chernihiv
 Ukrainian First League: 2017–18

References

External links
 
 
 
 

1996 births
Living people
Footballers from Chernihiv
Ukrainian footballers
Association football goalkeepers
FC Yunist Chernihiv players
FC Desna Chernihiv players
FC Mynai players
FC Hirnyk Kryvyi Rih players
FK Nevėžis players
FK Riteriai players
Ukrainian First League players
Ukrainian Second League players
A Lyga players
I Lyga players
Ukrainian expatriate footballers
Expatriate footballers in Lithuania
Ukrainian expatriate sportspeople in Lithuania